Mount Eliza can refer to:
 Mount Eliza, Victoria, a suburb of Melbourne, Australia
 Mount Eliza (Western Australia), a hill in Perth
 Mount Eliza (Tasmania), a summit in Southwest National Park, close to Mount Anne